Celerina may refer to the following places and jurisdictions :

 Celerina/Schlarigna, a municipality in the district of Maloja in the canton of Graubünden, Switzerland
 Celerina (Rhaetian Railway station), its railway station on the Albula railway line
 Celerina Staz (Rhaetian Railway station), its railway station on the Bernina railway line
 Celerina (see), a former Ancient city and bishopric in Numidia, now a Latin Catholic titular in modern Algeria